is a railway station on the Gakkentoshi Line in Kyōtanabe, Kyoto, Japan, operated by West Japan Railway Company (JR West).

Lines
Matsuiyamate Station is served by the Katamachi Line (Gakkentoshi Line)

Surrounding area

Kyotanabe Bus stop
The bus stop is located Kyotanabe Parking Area on Second Keihan Highway.
It takes about 7 minutes from here to the bus stop. And, the bus stop is passed through the Expressway buses which are bound for Tokyo and Osaka, Wakayama, Mount Koya.

History 
Matsuiyamate station was opened on 11 March 1989.

Station numbering was introduced in March 2018 with Matsuiyamate being assigned station number JR-H26.

Others
The station is going to be passed through Hokuriku Shinkansen around 2046.

References

External links
 JR West Official Website

Railway stations in Kyoto Prefecture
Railway stations in Japan opened in 1989